Peter Harper (born 11 December 1977) is an Australian former cricketer. He played two first-class cricket matches for Victoria between 1998 and 2001.

See also
 List of Victoria first-class cricketers

References

External links
 

1977 births
Living people
Australian cricketers
Victoria cricketers
Cricketers from Melbourne